= Canadian Party Life =

Digital media platform

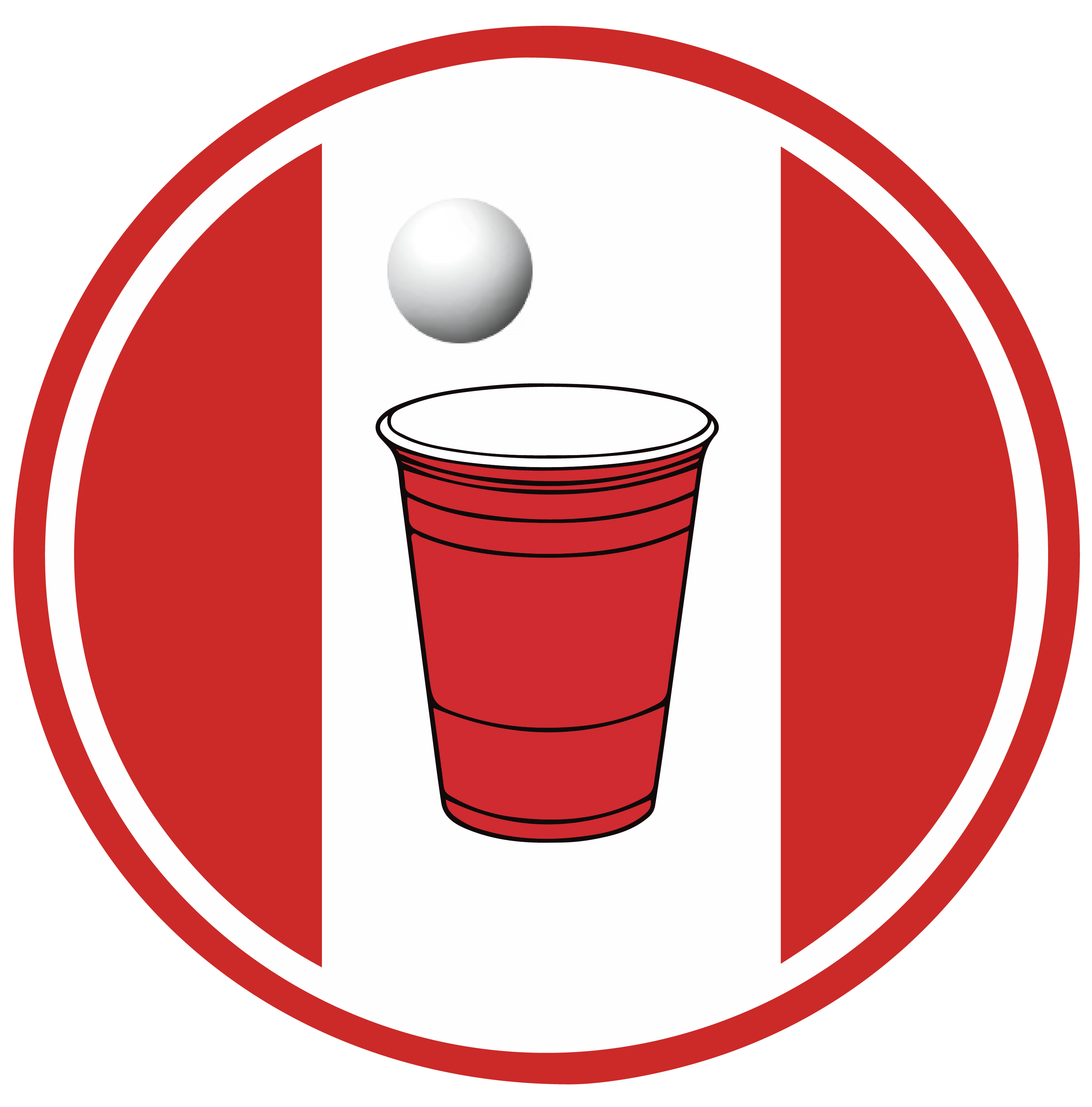
The profile picture for the Canadian Party Life Instagram account

Canadian Party Life (CPL) is an Instagram account featuring user-submitted content about student parties at Canadian universities. Founded in 2016, the CPL brand has multiple affiliated Instagram accounts (such as @ryersonupartylife and @cplgirls) that cater to specific campuses or interests. The main CPL account had about half a million followers as of September 2020 and the brand billed itself as "Canada's #1 party social media" on its official website (now defunct) where it also sold merchandise.

CPL and its affiliates received blame in the media for several instances of illegal and dangerous activities near university campuses. CPL was noted by the CBC as an example of a social media account promoting videos of a trend dubbed "brewfing" involving students partying on rooftops, which led to some partygoers being injured by jumping or falling from roofs. The affiliate Queen's Party Life hosted videos of illegal activity surrounding Queen's University 2019 homecoming weekend, including a video of a man punching a police officer. The administration of Dalhousie University directly called out Canadian Party Life for promoting a "toxic party lifestyle" in 2022, sending a memo to the student body warning students away from unsanctioned parties promoted by the brand. The previous September, hundreds of Dalhousie students had participated in a street party that resulted in ten people arrested for public intoxication. Despite the warning, in October 2022 an estimated 4,000 people turned out for a CPL-promoted street party that resulted in fires, assaults on police officers, and a stabbing, among other disruptive behaviors. Canadian Party Life boasted about gaining 1,000 new followers following Dalhousie's memo.
